Point Edward may refer to:

Point Edward, Ontario, Canada
Point Edward, Nova Scotia, Canada